Marina Promenade is a cluster of six residential towers located in Dubai Marina in Dubai, United Arab Emirates. The six towers range in height from 77 m (250 ft) to 147 m (480 ft). The shortest tower has 23 floors while the tallest has 39 floors.

See also
List of tallest buildings in Dubai

References

External links
Marina Promenade on Emporis.com

Residential buildings completed in 2008
Residential skyscrapers in Dubai